New Pilgrim Baptist Church is a historic church at 903 Sixth Ave South in Birmingham, Alabama.  It was built in a contemporary Gothic Revival style and was added to the National Register of Historic Places in 2007.

References 

Baptist churches in Alabama
Churches on the National Register of Historic Places in Alabama
National Register of Historic Places in Birmingham, Alabama
Churches in Birmingham, Alabama